Pirata is a genus of wolf spiders (family Lycosidae), commonly known as pirate wolf spiders.

Distribution
Species of this genus are present in most of Europe.

Species
The genus Pirata contains the following fifty species:

 Pirata abalosi (Mello-Leitão, 1942) – Argentina
 Pirata affinis Roewer, 1960 – Congo
 Pirata africana (Roewer, 1960) – Namibia
 Pirata alachuus Gertsch & Wallace, 1935 – USA
 Pirata allapahae Gertsch, 1940 – USA
 Pirata apalacheus Gertsch, 1940 – USA
 Pirata aspirans Chamberlin, 1904 – USA, Canada
 Pirata brevipes (Banks, 1893) – Congo
 Pirata browni Gertsch & Davis, 1940 – Mexico
 Pirata bryantae Kurata, 1944 – Canada, Alaska
 Pirata chamberlini (Lessert, 1927) – Congo, eastern Africa
 Pirata coreanus Paik, 1991 – Korea
 Pirata davisi Wallace & Exline, 1978 – USA, Mexico
 Pirata digitatus Tso & Chen, 2004 – Taiwan
 Pirata felix O. P.-Cambridge, 1898 – Mexico
 Pirata hiteorum Wallace & Exline, 1978 – USA
 Pirata indigenus Wallace & Exline, 1978 – USA
 Pirata iviei Wallace & Exline, 1978 – USA
 Pirata mayaca Gertsch, 1940 – USA, Bahamas, Cuba
 Pirata montanoides Banks, 1892 – USA
 Pirata montanus Emerton, 1885 – USA, Canada, Russia
 Pirata nanatus Gertsch, 1940 – USA
 Pirata niokolona Roewer, 1961 – Senegal
 Pirata pagicola Chamberlin, 1925 – Central America, Mexico
 Pirata pallipes (Blackwall, 1857) – Algeria
 Pirata piratellus (Strand, 1907) – Japan
 Pirata piraticus (Clerck, 1757) – Holarctic Region
 Pirata piratimorphus (Strand, 1908) – USA
 Pirata piscatorius (Clerck, 1757) – Palearctic Region
 Pirata praedo Kulczynski, 1885 – Russia (Urals to Far East), Mongolia, China, Japan, USA, Canada
 Pirata proximus O. P.-Cambridge, 1876 – Egypt
 Pirata sagitta (Mello-Leitão, 1941) – Argentina
 Pirata sedentarius Montgomery, 1904 – North America, Greater Antilles
 Pirata seminolus Gertsch & Wallace, 1935 – USA
 Pirata soukupi (Mello-Leitão, 1942) – Peru
 Pirata spatulatus Chai, 1985 – China
 Pirata spiniger (Simon, 1898) – USA
 Pirata subannulipes (Strand, 1906) – Ethiopia
 Pirata subpiraticus (Bösenberg & Strand, 1906) – Russia (Far East), Korea, China, Japan, Indonesia (Java), Philippines
 Pirata suwaneus Gertsch, 1940 – USA, Bahamas
 Pirata sylvanus Chamberlin & Ivie, 1944 – USA
 Pirata tenuitarsis Simon, 1876 – Europe to Mongolia
 Pirata timidus (Lucas, 1846) – Algeria
 Pirata trepidus Roewer, 1960 – Namibia
 Pirata triens Wallace & Exline, 1978 – USA
 Pirata turrialbicus Wallace & Exline, 1978 – Costa Rica, Panama, Cuba
 Pirata veracruzae Gertsch & Davis, 1940 – Mexico
 Pirata welakae Wallace & Exline, 1978 – USA
 Pirata werneri (Roewer, 1960) – Morocco
 Pirata zavattarii (Caporiacco, 1941) – Ethiopia

References

Lycosidae
Araneomorphae genera
Spiders of North America
Spiders of South America
Spiders of Africa
Spiders of Asia